Hobin is a surname. Notable people with the surname include:

 Donna Hobin (born 1956), Canadian basketball player
 Eric Hobin ( 2004–2007), English politician
 Jonathan Hobin (born 1979), Canadian photographer
 Mike Hobin (born 1954), Canadian ice hockey player

See also
 Hobie